Marcus Anthony Bryant is an American attorney and politician serving as a member of the Louisiana House of Representatives from the 96th district. He assumed office on January 13, 2020.

Education 
Bryant earned a Bachelor of Arts degree in English from Southern University and a Juris Doctor from the Southern University Law Center.

Career 
In 2007 and 2008, Bryant was a clerk for the United States District Court for the Western District of Louisiana. He also owns an independent law firm, where he specializes in injury law. Bryant was elected to the Louisiana House of Representatives in November 2019 and assumed office on January 13, 2020.

References 

Living people
Southern University alumni
Southern University Law Center alumni
Louisiana lawyers
Democratic Party members of the Louisiana House of Representatives
Year of birth missing (living people)